This is a list of channels available in Ireland. Public broadcaster Raidió Teilifís Éireann (4 channels), first commercial broadcaster Virgin Media Television (4 channels), Irish language channel TG4, and Irish Parliament Channel Oireachtas TV

Main channels

Entertainment channels

Northern Ireland channels

Children

News

Community channels

Other channels broadcasting to Ireland

Specialised channels for Ireland
These channels show local advertising and/or sponsorship for Ireland.

Pan-European/international channels

UK channels available in Ireland

Proposed and Defunct channels

Proposed
Atomic TV: A 24-hour music channel was expected to launch in the 1990s.
Property TV and WTV: both of these channels were proposed to launch in 2008.

Unknown dates
 Capital Television - this was another short-lived Dublin channel which only broadcast a caption for a week, along with a testcard at night another week. It was a pirate TV channel.

1980s
 Channel 3 - (Later known as Channel D) was a short-lived Dublin based television station broadcasting from July 1981 to November 1981. It was a pirate TV channel.
 Nova TV - this was another Dublin pirate TV channel that was broadcast for a short time in the 1980s.

1990s
 RLO TV - this was another legal/pirate television station (Satellite and UHF), broadcast in Limerick by Radio Limerick One in 1999 and 2000. An official license was granted for the satellite service in 1997 at which time digital broadcasts began making this the first digital television channel in Ireland beating RTÉ by years. During the UHF years while the station was not airing its own content they would broadcast a relay of UK Channel 5.

2000s
 Waterford@8 - this was a sister local TV service of WLR FM in Waterford. It was available on cable in Waterford city and Dungarvan and on MMDS in east Waterford and south Kilkenny. The service launched in 2000, and ceased in 2005.
 Sky News Ireland - this was an Irish version of Sky News, carried to Ireland on Sky Digital, and by most cable companies. It ceased broadcasting in November 2006 due to low audience figures.
 Chorus Sports - this was on Chorus Cable, which showed local sports, greyhound racing, and national motor racing events. This ceased broadcasting in January 2007.
 Bubble Hits Ireland - this was a 24-hour music channel targeting both Ireland and the rest of Europe (European version). On 13 February 2009, Bubble Hits ceased broadcasting due to a downturn in advertising revenue.
Channel 6 - active from 2006 to January 2009; replaced by 3e.

2010s

In December 2016, Irish TV confirmed it would cease broadcasting.
On Sunday 8 January 2017 UTV Ireland ceased broadcasting.
MTV Music Irish feed ceased in July 2019 and temporarily replaced by MTV Music UK.

2020s
Channels operated by Sky, BBC, Paramount Global, Warner Media and Discovery are registered to broadcast in Ireland as they are registered in Luxembourg, the Netherlands and the Czech Republic, from 1 January 2021. Previously the Irish feeds of these channels were regulated by the UK regulator OFCOM.
In late 2021, eir dropped its eir sport channels.
In 11 April 2022, Virgin Media Sport is closed.
On 12 April 2022, Virgin Media Television launched Virgin Media More.

See also
 Television in Ireland
 Timeline of commercial television in the Republic of Ireland

References

 
Ireland
Television stations